The  is Japanese aerial lift line in Nishi, Hamamatsu, Shizuoka, operated by . Opened in 1960, the aerial lift links Kanzanji Onsen and Mount Ōkusa, across the northern cove of Lake Hamana.

Basic data
Cable length: 
Vertical interval:

See also
Enshū Railway Line
List of aerial lifts in Japan

External links
 Kanzanji Ropeway official website

Aerial tramways in Japan
1960 establishments in Japan